Obrastsovo-Travino is a rural locality (a selo) and the administrative center of Obrastsovo-Travinsky Selsoviet, Kamyzyaksky District, Astrakhan Oblast, Russia. The population was 2,730 as of 2010. There are 31 streets.

Geography 
Obrastsovo-Travino is located 26 km south of Kamyzyak (the district's administrative centre) by road. Nizhnenikolsky is the nearest rural locality.

References 

Rural localities in Kamyzyaksky District